Garrha mesogaea is a moth in the family Oecophoridae. It was described by Turner in 1916. It is found in Australia, where it has been recorded from Queensland.

The wingspan is 14–18 mm. The forewings are ochreous-grey-whitish, the discal spots obsolete, or one or two spots faintly indicated. The costal edge is pink.

References

Moths described in 1916
Garrha